Steamed meatball is a common Cantonese dim sum dish. It is popular in Hong Kong and most overseas Chinatowns. The meatballs are usually made of minced beef, with water chestnut to add texture and with coriander and a few slivers of cheung pei or dried orange peel used as seasoning. A layer of tofu skin, or sometimes peas, are used to raise the meatballs from the bottom of the dish and prevent them from sitting in the cooking juices. It is generally served with Worcestershire sauce.

History
The meatball originated from Muslims during the Tang Dynasty and Song Dynasty. Many Hui Muslims, the descendants of Arab traders, live in Guangzhou.

See also

 Shumai
 Beef ball
 Lion's head (food)
 Pork ball
 Meatball
 Fish ball
 List of meatball dishes
 List of pork dishes
 List of steamed foods

References

Beef dishes
Dim sum
Cantonese cuisine
Hong Kong cuisine
Meatballs
Meatball